Monkey Puss (Live in London) is a live album by Swedish band Entombed recorded during the 1992 Gods of Grind tour in London. It was released in 1999 on Earache Records.

Also a video version is available, which is the only official live video of early Entombed.
Originally it was released on VHS cassette, it was later re-released in 2001 on DVD. The VHS and DVD version contain five additional non-live videos (Left Hand Path, Stranger Aeons, Hollowman, Wolverine Blues and Night of the Vampire).

Monkey Puss can be seen during video as being written with feltpen on Nicke Andersson's snare drum, as well as on one of the band member's guitars, hence the album name.

Track listing

References

Entombed (band) albums
1999 live albums
Earache Records live albums
Live video albums
1999 video albums
Earache Records video albums